Solvang is a Norwegian shipping company that operates sixteen vessels, including LPG and LPG/ethylene carriers. It also has seven new-build ships from Meyer Werft in Rostock and Hyundai Heavy Industries in Ulsan Korea. Clipper Orion (60 000 m³), its first LPG carrier from HHI, was scheduled to be delivered on 28 May 2008. The company was founded in 1936 and based in Stavanger.

Shipping companies of Norway
Transport companies of Rogaland
Companies based in Stavanger
Gas shipping companies
Car carrier shipping companies
Transport companies established in 1936
1936 establishments in Norway
Companies listed on the Oslo Stock Exchange